Metro Walk is an open shopping mall which includes Adventure Island as an amusement park located in Rohini, Delhi, India.

Features

Metro Walk was developed by the Appu Ghar Group and the Unitech Group. It is located in Sector 10 of Rohini, adjacent to Rithala metro station. The mall and amusement park were master planned by the Florida-based company Bose International. It has an  outdoor shopping area which houses outlets of many leading national and international brands including Burger King, McDonald, Woodland, Decathlon, Pantaloons, Reebok and Nike. There are many stand-alone restaurants as well as food court kiosks. A separate zone, designed along with Turner Network Television, is called Planet Pogo and houses a MAD theatre and Pogo plazas for children. A large lake acts as the separator between the mall building and the amusement park.

References

External links
Official website
Unitech Metro Walk Mall on www.shoppingmalls.in

Amusement parks in India
Shopping malls in Delhi
2009 establishments in Delhi
Amusement parks opened in 2009
Shopping malls established in 2009